Metropolitan Hospital Center (MHC, also referred to as Metropolitan Hospital) is a hospital in East Harlem, New York City. It has been affiliated with New York Medical College since it was founded in 1875, representing the oldest partnership between a hospital and a private medical school in the United States.

MHC is part of the New York City Health and Hospitals Corporation (HHC), the largest municipal hospital and healthcare system in the country.

Location
Metropolitan is located near the border of East Harlem with Upper East Side and Yorkville. The physical plant extends from First to Second avenues between East 97th and 99th streets. The hospital caters to a wide spectrum of patient population and disease pathology.

Transportation
The 96th Street station of the Second Avenue Subway, one block from the hospital's entrance, is served by the New York City Subway's .

History
Metropolitan Hospital Center was founded in September 1875 as the Homeopathic Hospital. It was established by the New York City Department of Public Charities and Correction on Wards Island. It was later known as the Ward's Island Hospital.

In 1894, the hospital moved to Blackwell's Island (currently known as Roosevelt Island). It occupied the former New York City Asylum for the Insane and was renamed Metropolitan Hospital.

The hospital moved into two newly constructed buildings at its present location in East Harlem in 1955. In 1966, the hospital added its Mental Health Building, an adjoining 14-story pavilion housing the hospital's psychiatric services. In 1969, Frederick Wiseman filmed a documentary using the hospital's emergency room titled Hospital, which won two Emmys for Outstanding Achievement in News Documentary Programming - Individuals and Outstanding Achievement in News Documentary Programming, and in 1994 the National Film Registry selected the film for preservation. In 1971, The Hospital starring George C. Scott was filmed in a psychiatric wing which was nearing completion.

In the 1980s, the hospital was threatened with closure due to funding cuts. NYC Mayor Ed Koch reached a $45 million, three-year agreement with the Department of Health and Human Services to develop a new project to demonstrate innovative ways of delivering health care to East Harlem's poor.

In 1995, the hospital was listed as having 607 beds.

Designations
Metropolitan Hospital Center is the first hospital in East Harlem designated as a stroke center by the New York State Department of Health.

The hospital has been designated as a Sexual Assault Forensic Examination (SAFE) Center of Excellence by the New York State Department of Health. A Sexual Assault Response Team (SART) is also on location, composed of specially trained Sexual Assault Forensic Examiners, medical personnel, patient advocates, social workers, law enforcement officers (Special Victims Unit) and representatives of the New York County District Attorney's Office Sex Crimes Unit.

References

External links 

 Internal Medicine Residency Program at Metropolitan Hospital Center

Hospital buildings completed in 1955
Hospital buildings completed in 1966
Hospitals in Manhattan
Hospitals established in 1875
East Harlem
NYC Health + Hospitals
1875 establishments in New York (state)
Public hospitals in the United States